Velgonda is a village in Karimnagar district, Telangana, India. It falls under Dharmapuri mandal. The National Highway 16 or NH-16 passes through this village.

References

Villages in Karimnagar district